Povl Henrik Frederiksen (born 9 April 1950) is a Danish former footballer who played as a defender. He made four appearances for the Denmark national team from 1970 to 1971.

References

External links
 
 
 

1950 births
Living people
Danish men's footballers
Association football defenders
Denmark international footballers
Hvidovre IF players